Mount Vision may refer to:

 Eagle Hill (Louisiana), a summit in Sabine Parish, Louisiana
 Eagle Hill (New York), a summit in Otsego County, New York
 Eagle Hill (Budapest), a hill in Hungary